Tetelcingo Nahuatl, called Mösiehuali̱ by its speakers, is a Nahuatl variety of central Mexico. It is one of the core varieties closely related to Classical Nahuatl. It is spoken in the town of Tetelcingo, Morelos, and the adjacent Colonia Cuauhtémoc and Colonia Lázaro Cárdenas. These three population centers lie to the north of Cuautla, Morelos and have been largely absorbed into its urban area; as a result the Tetelcingo language and culture are under intense pressure.

In 1935 William Cameron Townsend published a study of Mösiehuali̱, and a number of other studies have been published since then.

Phonology

Vowels
Tetelcingo Nahuatl has converted the distinction of vowel quantity found in more conservative varieties into one of vowel quality.

Consonants

Tetelcingo Nahuatl, like many dialects of Nahuatl, does not have voiced obstruent consonants (with one clear exception: the stem /maga/, meaning 'fight' is derived from /maka/ 'give, hit'). Voiced obstruents and other non-native consonants do occur in loanwords from Spanish, however, and there are many such words in the language.

Honorifics

Another striking characteristic of Tetelcingo Nahuatl is the pervasiveness and complexity of its honorifics. Generally every 2nd or 3rd person verb, pronoun, postposition or possessed noun must be marked honorifically if its subject or object, designatum, object or possessor (respectively) is a living adult (the speaker's wife or adult children being exceptions). Extra-honorific forms of several kinds exist, especially for addressing or referring to godparental relations, high officials or God. Many third person honorifics use morphemes that in Classical Nahuatl were used to mark non-active (passive) verbs or unspecified or plural participants. Not infrequently a different (suppletive) stem is used for honorifics, or the honorific form is in some other way irregular.

A few examples are given below, using the orthography of Brewer and Brewer 1962. Where more than one form is listed, the second is more highly honorific.

References

External links

(SIL Mexico) – includes sound recordings
Mösiehuali̱ Honorifics – includes sound recordings
Spanish loans in Mösiehuali̱ – includes sound recordings
Texts in Mösiehuali̱

Literature

Brewer, Forrest, y Jean G. Brewer. 1962.  Vocabulario mexicano de Tetelcingo. Vocabularios indígenas “Mariano Silva y Aceves” 8. México: Instituto Lingüístico de Verano.
Pittman, Richard S. 1948.  “Nahuatl honorifics”. International Journal of American Linguistics 14:236-39.
Pittman, Richard S. 1954.  A grammar of Tetelcingo (Morelos) Nahuatl. Language Dissertation 50 (supplement to Language 30).
Tuggy, David. 1979.  “Tetelcingo Nahuatl”. Modern Aztec Grammatical Sketches, 1-140, Ronald W. Langacker, ed. Studies in Uto-Aztecan Grammar, vol. 2. Arlington, TX: Summer Institute of Linguistics and University of Texas at Arlington.
Tuggy, David. 1981. Electronic version 2008. The transitivity-related verbal morphology of Tetelcingo Nahuatl: an exploration in Space [Cognitive] grammar. UC San Diego doctoral dissertation.

Nahuatl